Mere Green may refer to:
Mere Green, Birmingham, England
Mere Green, Worcestershire, England